Chamberlain is a village in the Canadian province of Saskatchewan within the Rural Municipality of Sarnia No. 221 and Census Division No. 6.

Chamberlain is notable for being the last community between Regina and Saskatoon that Highway 11, the Louis Riel Trail, still passes through. The highway narrows to two lanes and its speed limit is reduced from 110 km/h to 50 km/h. A number of small restaurants and gas stations benefit from having traffic pass through at slow speed. The village is only about half an hour drive from Moose Jaw, an hour from Regina and one and a half hours from Saskatoon. Highway 11 has been realigned around all other communities along its route.

History 
Chamberlain incorporated as a village on January 31, 1911.

Demographics 

See also
List of communities in Saskatchewan
List of villages in Saskatchewan

References

External links 
 

Villages in Saskatchewan
Sarnia No. 221, Saskatchewan
Division No. 6, Saskatchewan